The 31st South American Junior Championships in Athletics were held in Concepción, Chile from October 22–23, 1999.

Participation (unofficial)
Detailed result lists can be found on the "World Junior Athletics History" website.  An unofficial count yields the number of about 278 athletes from about 11 countries:  Argentina (47), Bolivia (9), Brazil (63), Chile (59), Colombia (15), Ecuador (30), Panama (4), Paraguay (4), Peru (15), Uruguay (10), Venezuela (22).

Medal summary
Medal winners are published for men and women
Complete results can be found on the "World Junior Athletics History" website.

Men

Women

Medal table (unofficial)

References

External links
World Junior Athletics History

South American U20 Championships in Athletics
1999 in Chilean sport
South American U20 Championships
International athletics competitions hosted by Chile
1999 in youth sport